Baron Crathorne, of Crathorne in the North Riding of the County of York, is a title in the Peerage of the United Kingdom. It was created in 1959 for the Conservative politician and former Minister of Agriculture and Fisheries, Sir Thomas Dugdale, 1st Baronet. He had already been created a baronet, of Crathorne in the North Riding of the County of York, in 1945.  the titles are held by his son, the second Baron, who succeeded in 1977. Lord Crathorne is one of the ninety elected hereditary peers that remain in the House of Lords after the passing of the House of Lords Act 1999, and sits as a Conservative.

The family seat is Crathorne House, near Yarm, North Yorkshire.

Barons Crathorne (1959)
Thomas Lionel Dugdale, 1st Baron Crathorne (1897–1977)
Charles James Dugdale, 2nd Baron Crathorne (born 1939)

The heir apparent is the present holder's only son Hon. Thomas Arthur John Dugdale (born 1977).

Line of succession

  Major Thomas Lionel Dugdale, 1st Baron Crathorne (1897–1977)
  Charles James Dugdale, 2nd Baron Crathorne (born 1939)
 (1) Hon. Thomas Arthur John Dugdale (b. 1977)
 (2) Hon. David John Dugdale (b. 1942)
 (3) Jonathan William Shaun Dugdale (b. 1980)

Arms

References

Kidd, Charles, Williamson, David (editors). Debrett's Peerage and Baronetage (1990 edition). New York: St Martin's Press, 1990, Pages 303, 609

Baronies in the Peerage of the United Kingdom
Noble titles created in 1959
Noble titles created for UK MPs